wm2 is a minimalist reparenting window manager for the X Window System written by Chris Cannam. It provides support for moving, resizing, and deleting windows, but does not support icons. Instead of icons, wm2 allows temporary hiding of windows from the desktop environment. Hidden windows can be recovered via a menu from the root window. It does not support interactive configurability, or provide a virtual desktop, and other features of modern window managers such as configurable root menus, toolbars, etc. Configuration options require editing and recompiling a source file and few options are available.

wmx
wmx is a version of wm2 modified to add features such as virtual desktops and anti-aliased fonts via Xft. , it is maintained by its original author.

References

Further reading

External links
 

Free X window managers